Marian Dumitru (born 18 March 1960) is a retired Romanian handball player. Between 1980 and 1996 he played 231 matches for the national team and scored 754 goals. He competed at the 1980, 1984 and 1992 Olympics and 1982, 1986 and 1990 world championships and won bronze medals in 1980, 1984 and 1990. At the club level he played for Steaua Bucharest, winning 11 national championships and reaching the EHF Champions League final in 1989. The same year, he signed for TEKA Santander in Spain, where he won the EHF Cup Winners' Cup in 1990. He then went to play in the Bundesliga for TSV Bayer Dormagen. In the 1993–94 season, he won the EHF Cup with Alzira Avidesa.

After retiring from competitions in 1996 he became a handball coach and worked mainly in Germany. His son, Sergiu (born 1987) plays handball in Germany.

References

External links
Olympics profile

1960 births
Living people
Sportspeople from Ploiești
CSA Steaua București (handball) players
Liga ASOBAL players
Handball-Bundesliga players
Handball players at the 1980 Summer Olympics
Handball players at the 1984 Summer Olympics
Handball players at the 1992 Summer Olympics
Olympic handball players of Romania
Romanian male handball players
Expatriate handball players
Romanian expatriate sportspeople in Spain
Romanian expatriate sportspeople in Germany
Olympic bronze medalists for Romania
Olympic medalists in handball
Medalists at the 1984 Summer Olympics
Medalists at the 1980 Summer Olympics